A communication endpoint is a type of communication network node. It is an interface exposed by a communicating party or by a communication channel. An example of the latter type of a communication endpoint is a publish-subscribe topic  or a group in group communication systems.

See also
Node (networking)
Terminal (telecommunication)
Connection-oriented communication
Data terminal equipment
Dial peer
End system
Host (network)

References

Computing terminology
Telecommunications